Theodor Lohrmann (7 September 1898 – 2 September 1971) was a German international footballer. He was a very talented all-round athlete who also played rugby, tennis, handball and water polo, and was one of the first German professional athletes. With FK Austria Wien (then Wiener Amateursportverein) he celebrated the Austrian Championship and the Cup in 1924 and 1926. After his career he was successful as a coach. Among others, he trained Toni Turek, the 1954 World Champion goalkeeper.

References

1898 births
1971 deaths
Association football goalkeepers
German footballers
Germany international footballers
SV Waldhof Mannheim players
SpVgg Greuther Fürth players
FK Austria Wien players
Wiener Sport-Club players
German football managers
Schwarz-Weiß Essen managers
FC Zürich managers
Professional tennis players before the Open Era